Étienne Boileau (1200 or 1210 – April 1270) was one of the first known provosts of Paris. In 1261, he was named provost (1261–1271), by King Louis IX.  Boileau brought together the regulations on the police, industry and the trades of Paris in this "Book of the Trades." This work in prose is a faithful mirror reflecting the smallest details of the industrial and commercial life of Paris in  the 13th century.  The work is the oldest document on the legislation of the communities of craftsmen in France, written in 1268. Jean de Joinville draws a very flattering portrait of Boileau in his History of St. Louis. According to Joinville, Boileau was a just man  without undue consideration for the wealth or status of the accused, and thus disencumbered the city of all its robbers and criminals.

References
Le Livre des Métiers

13th-century French judges
Mayors of Paris
13th-century births
1270 deaths